Pietro di Miniato or Pietro di San Miniato (c. 1366 - 1430–46) was an Italian painter, active in Florence and Prato, in a Gothic style. He collaborated with a relative Antonio di Miniato di Piero, likely his son, active circa 1430 in and around Prato. Among the works attributed to him are a painted crucifix in the St Louis Museum of Art, a polyptych in the Museo Civico of Prato, a painted mural in the church of San Niccolò in Prato, and a mural in the Chapel of San Stefano of the Duomo di Prato, depicting the Virgin and child flanked by saints.
 An Annunciation in Santa Maria Novella, Florence, long unattributed, is now identified as the work of Pietro di Miniato.

References

14th-century Italian painters
Italian male painters
15th-century Italian painters
Painters from Tuscany
1360s births
1430s deaths
Gothic painters